The Weeks Bay National Estuarine Research Reserve is a field laboratory and research facility  along Weeks Bay estuary, about  in size. It receives freshwater from the Magnolia and Fish Rivers, and drains a  watershed into the portion of Mobile Bay via a narrow opening.  This sub-estuary of Mobile Bay averages just 4.8 ft (1.5 meters) deep  and is fringed with marsh (Spartina, Juncus) and swamp (pine, oak, magnolia, maple, cypress, bayberry, tupelo and others). The reserve lands also include upland and bottomland hardwood forests, freshwater marsh (Typha, Cladium), submerged aquatic vegetation (Ruppia, Vallisneria) and unique bog habitats (Sarracenia, Drosera). Weeks Bay is a critical nursery for shrimp, bay anchovy, blue crab and multitudes of other fish, crustaceans and shellfish that support robust commercial fisheries providing $450 million/year for Alabama.

The Weeks Bay estuary, "where rivers meet the sea," is an important site of scientific research on estuarine ecology. The Weeks Bay Interpretive Center offers the public opportunities to learn about coastal habitats through its exhibit, live animals displays and collections of animals and regional plants. Self-guiding nature trails wind through wetlands, marshes, bogs and forests.

In 2014, the Reserve joined with other conservancy groups to secure a tract of land which now protects the undeveloped marine forests near the bay. The Weeks Bay Foundation is a fully accredited member of The Land Trust Alliance.

References

National Estuarine Research Reserves of the United States
Estuaries of Alabama
Mobile Bay
Nature centers in Alabama
Nature reserves in Alabama
Protected areas of Baldwin County, Alabama
Gulf Coast of the United States
Nature conservation organizations based in the United States